A burgher was a rank or title of a privileged citizen of medieval towns in early modern Europe. Burghers formed the pool from which city officials could be drawn, and their immediate families that formed the social class of the medieval bourgeoisie.

Admission
Entry into burgher status varied from country to country and city to city. In Slovakia proof of ownership of property in a town was a condition for acceptance as a burgher.

Privileges
Any crime against a burgher was taken as a crime against the city community. In Switzerland if a burgher was assassinated, the other burghers had the right to bring the supposed murderer to trial by judicial combat. 

In the Netherlands burghers were often exempted from "corvee" or forced labor, a privilege which later extended to the Dutch East Indies.  Only burghers could join the city guard in Amsterdam because in order to join, guardsmen had to purchase their own equipment.  Membership in the guard was often a stepping stone to political positions.

British Isles

Germany

Low Countries

Switzerland

Specific cities
 Bourgeois of Brussels
 Bourgeois of Paris
 Bourgeoisie of Geneva
 Hanseaten

References

 
Medieval society
Titles
Medieval titles
Estates (social groups)
Bourgeoisie